Euphorbia sieboldiana, the Siebold's spurge, is a species of flowering plant in the spurge family Euphorbiaceae. It is native to eastern Asia, where it is found in China, Japan, Korea, and eastern Russia. Its natural habitat is in grassy areas and forest margins. It is a common species in Japan.

It is an rhizomatous perennial growing to 70 cm tall. It produces small flowers in compact pseudoumbels. These lack petal-like appendages. This species can be readily identified by the horn-like projections on the glands of the involucre. Blooming time is in spring and early summer.

Toxicity and medicinal uses
The plant is used medicinally in China, where it has the common name Langdu (狼毒花) lit. "wolf poison" (狼 lang "wolf" + 毒 dú "poison" + 花 huā "flower"). It shares this vernacular name with two other medicinal plants: Euphorbia fischeriana and the unrelated Stellera chamaejasme (family Thymelaceae) - which nonetheless has similar qualities, medicinal properties and uses, these being pungency, toxicity, cathartic, anthelmintic and expectorant activity, and topical use to treat ulcers and skin diseases.

References

sieboldiana
Flora of Korea
Taxa named by Joseph Decaisne
Taxa named by Charles François Antoine Morren